Inape saetiphora is a species of moth of the family Tortricidae which is endemic to Peru.

The ground colour of the forewings is brownish, although more grey in the apical third of wing and tinged whitish grey between the fasciae. The markings are dark brown with rust admixture. The hindwings are greyish cream, but pale basally and mixed brownish grey and spotted in the distal half.

Etymology
The species name refers to the setose sacculus and is derived from Latin saeta (meaning seta) and Greek phoreo (meaning I carry).

References

Moths described in 2010
Endemic fauna of Peru
Moths of South America
saetiphora
Taxa named by Józef Razowski